Vitalis Haim Danon (December 10, 1897 – June 1, 1969) was a Jewish-Tunisian writer and professor. Danon is notable for his groundbreaking portrayal of day-to-day Jewish Tunisian life in his book, Ninette de la Rue du Péché (Ninette of Sin Street).

Early life and education
Danon was born in Edirne, Turkey, which at the time was part of the Ottoman Empire. His family was Sephardi Jews.

Danon graduated from the Alliance Israélite Universelle (AIU) in Paris. In 1917, he earned a degree from the teachers' college, École Normale Israélite Orientale (ENIO) in Paris.

Career
In 1919, Danon became the director of the AIU school that was located in Sfax, Tunisia.

From 1921 to 1926, Danon was the director of Tunisia's largest AIU school, Tunis Ecole de la Hafsia.

In 1929, he co-authored the book La Hara conte...Folklore Judéo-Tunisien with Raphael Lévy (Ryvel) and Jacques Véhel. Danon then published Aron le colporteur (Aaron the peddler) in 1933 and in 1934, he published Dieu a pardonné (God forgive). 

In 1938, Danon published his most successful book, Ninette de la Rue du Péché (Ninette of Sin Street). From 1954 to 1955, Danon published two volumes of Petite histoire des Juifs. 

In 1955, Danon published "Etude sociale sur cent familles juives de la Hara." 
Danon was the director of all AIU schools from 1954 to 1960.

Danon retired to Cannes in 1960 and died in 1969.

Selected works and publications

Works
 
 
 
 
  – 2 volumes: 1. De la Création à la captivité de Babylone. 1954. 2. Du retour de la captivité à la mort de Saadia. 1955

English translations

Selected publications

References

Jewish Tunisian history
Tunisian Jews
Turkish Sephardi Jews
Jewish writers
Jewish educators
1897 births
1969 deaths
Emigrants from the Ottoman Empire to France